Jessica Amundson (born May 14, 1984 as Jessica Mair) is a Canadian curler. She played second for the 2012 national champion Heather Nedohin rink.

Before joining the Nedohin rink, Amundson was a top collegiate curler. In 2005, she won the Alberta collegiate championship. She also represented the University of Alberta at the 2010 CIS/CCA Curling Championships, where her rink lost to the University of Waterloo in a tie-breaker.

In 2009, Amundson joined the Nedohin rink. The team won their first national championship in 2012, at the 2012 Scotties Tournament of Hearts.

She has not curled competitively since 2014.

Personal
Amundson is a grade six teacher in Beaumont, Alberta.

References

External links
 
 Jessica Mair and Team Nedohin take Scotties Championship
 
 

1984 births
Living people
Canadian educators
Canadian women curlers
Canadian women's curling champions
Curlers from Edmonton
Continental Cup of Curling participants
Canada Cup (curling) participants
21st-century Canadian women